The Johannesburg Institute for Advanced Study (JIAS) is a joint initiative of the University of Johannesburg (UJ), South Africa, and Nanyang Technological University (NTU), Singapore.

Description
Launched on 14 May 2015, JIAS claims to reach beyond the regular teaching and research routines of contemporary higher education by encouraging collaborative and focused scholarly initiatives in both the Humanities and Natural Sciences.

Institutes for Advanced Study (IAS) are involved with research and higher education. They are designed to afford top quality researchers with an opportunity to focus entirely on their central calling in their respective fields, either individually or in collaborative enterprise. JIAS is the first fully-fledged institute of advanced learning in South Africa’s political and economic heartland. Being rooted within UJ, and keen to foster UJ’s institutional goals, JIAS also co-operates with all HE institutions in the country.

JIAS’ partnership with NTU provides opportunities to unite African and Asian thought and multidisciplinary research. As a guiding principle, the selection of fellows is on the quality of the proposed research and the researchers. In pursuit of this, JIAS seeks out global leaders in their respective fields, including Nobel Laureates.

JIAS operates from a residential facility that is located in the suburbs of Johannesburg. The founding meeting of JIAS, which was jointly chaired by the vice-chancellor of UJ, Professor Ihron Rensburg, and the president of the NTU, Professor Bertil Andersson, was held on the day of the JIAS launch. Others in attendance were Professor K.K. Phua, director of the NTU Institute for Advanced Study, Professor Tshilidzi Marwala, then deputy vice chancellor (research, postgraduate studies & library) and subsequently its vice-chancellor and principal, UJ, Dr Yu-Hyun Park, president’s office, NTU, and Professor Peter Vale, who is the director of JIAS.

Since 2019, Dr Bongani Ngqulunga has been the director of JIAS.

References

Educational institutions established in 2015
Nanyang Technological University
University of Johannesburg
2015 establishments in South Africa